Shizuishan, formerly Shizuizi, is a prefecture-level city in the Ningxia Hui Autonomous Region of the People's Republic of China. It is the northernmost prefecture in Ningxia and the second most populous, after the regional capital Yinchuan, bordered by Inner Mongolia to all directions except the south. Shizuishan sits on the western bank of the Yellow River on the western side of the Ordos Loop. It was formerly a center for caravans traveling the northern routes to and from Beijing across the Ordos Desert.

Name
Shizuishan was formerly romanized as Shetsuishan and Shihchu Shan.

It was also formerly known as "Shizuizi", which was romanized Shihtsuitzu and Chetsouidze.

History 
Shizuishan used to be a center of local trade and eventually became a mining town. In 1934, Shizuishan was occupied by the army of warlord Sun Dianying during his attempt to conquer Ningxia from the Ma clique. Sun set up a rival provincial government in the town, but he was eventually defeated by Ningxia's official governor Ma Hongkui. Shizuishan was consequently returned to Ma's control.

Administrative divisions

Geography and Climate

Environmental issues

In 2005, the Chinese government blacklisted the city for its pollution problem and told local leaders to shut down the worst polluting industrial plants. Recently, the city has attempted to reinvent itself by initiating eco-friendly programs to reduce pollution, improving medical services, increasing tourism, and improve certain industries but pollution is still taking its toll on the people.

Economy 
The economy of Shizuishan is mainly based on coal mining, coking, and metallurgy. Agriculture, tourism, and viticulture also contribute to Shizuishan's economy.

Education
 Ningxia University

References

Citations

Bibliography
 , reprint. 
 
 .
 .
 .

External links
- Shizuishan City Government Website

Prefecture-level divisions of Ningxia
National Forest Cities in China
Cities in Ningxia